A by-election was held for the Australian House of Representatives seat of Wilmot in Tasmania on 26 February 1904. This was triggered by the death of former Premier of Tasmania and federal Free Trade Party MP Sir Edward Braddon on 2 February 1904.

The by-election was won by Free Trade candidate Norman Cameron (a former member of the Tasmanian House of Assembly, and who had represented Tasmania in the Australian House of Representatives until he was voted out in the 1903 federal election), against John Cheek for the Protectionist Party. Voting was not compulsory in 1904.

Results

Sir Edward Braddon died.

See also
 List of Australian federal by-elections

References

1904 elections in Australia
Tasmanian federal by-elections
1900s in Tasmania